Vännäs Municipality is a municipality in Västerbotten County in northern Sweden. Its seat is located in Vännäs.

History
In 1928 the locality Vännäs was detached from the rural municipality with the same name, forming the market town (köping) of Vännäs. The two entities were reunited in 1971. In 1974 Bjurholm Municipality was added. A split took place in 1980 when Bjurholm Municipality was re-established.

Geography
The municipality is located just west of Umeå Municipality, where Umeå is the seat, with about 110,000 inhabitants, and it is part of the Umeå region. This is evident considering that the municipality has 1,500 people commuting to Umeå Municipality and about 400 commuters from Umeå Municipality. Its neighbouring municipalities Vindeln Municipality, Bjurholm Municipality and Nordmaling Municipality only receive a total of about 100 commuters from Vännäs Municipality and Vännäs Municipality receives a total of 200 commuters from them.

Localities
There are two localities (or urban areas) in Vännäs Municipality:

The municipal seat in bold

See also
 Blue Highway, tourist route (Norway - Sweden - Finland - Russia)

References

External links

Vännäs Municipality - Official site

Municipalities of Västerbotten County